Pilis Mountains is a mountainous region in the Transdanubian Mountains. It is a popular hiking destination in Hungary.

It is the direct southern neighbour of the Visegrád Mountains which are based on volcanic rocks while Pilis is sedimentary.

History of the region 
The region used to be a hunting area for the mediaeval kings. Numerous hunting lodges have survived. One of the most frequented areas was around the village Pilisszentkereszt.

Mountains of the range 

 , the second highest point of Transdanubia.
 
Csikóváralja

References

Transdanubian Mountains
Biosphere reserves of Hungary